Berneval-le-Grand is a former commune in the Seine-Maritime department in the Normandy region in northern France. On 1 January 2016, it was merged into the new commune of Petit-Caux.

Geography

History
On the morning of 19 August 1942, the beach at Berneval was one of the landing locations of the Anglo-Canadian raid on Dieppe. No. 3 Commando landed on "Yellow 1", the beach of Petit Berneval, but got stuck at the top of the cliffs, unable to fulfil their mission. Most were killed or captured, only one managed to escape by swimming back to the boats. Those who landed on "Yellow 2", at the Fond de Belleville, crossed the fields and attacked the gun emplacements, preventing the German gunners aiming at the beaches of Dieppe where the bulk of the landings took place. They all were able to escape by the same route and return to Newhaven.

Heraldry

Population

Places of interest
 The church of Notre-Dame, rebuilt, as was most of the village, after the Second World War. The original church, dating back to the 13th century, was destroyed on 3 June 1944 by Allied bombers.

Notable people linked to the commune 
 After his release from Reading Prison, Oscar Wilde stayed in Berneval in June 1897. He was accompanied by his friend and future literary executor, the Canadian journalist, art critic and art dealer Robert Ross. Most of his former friends abandoned him, but André Gide came to meet him at the Hôtel de la Plage (destroyed during the Second World War). He found Wilde a broken man, still a prisoner in his soul despite his freedom. In Berneval, Wilde wrote The Ballad of Reading Gaol.
 Edward Vincent Loustalot, regarded as the first American soldier killed by the Germans in the Second World War, died here on 19 August 1942.
 During the 1970s, a large part of Walerian Borowczyk's film, Les Contes immoraux (Eng: Immoral Tales), was made in Berneval in the Grand Hôtel, Avenue du Capitaine-Porthéous.
 Auguste Renoir, Pissarro and Hippolyte Camille Delpy, among others, painted landscapes in Berneval-le-Grand.

See also
Communes of the Seine-Maritime department

References

Former communes of Seine-Maritime